Krishnanagar (also known as Jhandenagar) is a municipality in Kapilvastu district of Lumbini Zone in the western terai part of Nepal. The municipality was established on 18 May 2014 by merging the existing Krishnanagar, Sirsihawa, Shivanagar village development committees (VDCs).  on Nepal's southern border with India across from Barhani Bazar.  Movement of Indian and Nepalese nationals across the border is unrestricted, however there is a customs checkpoint for goods.  Goods bound for Dang and Arcghakhanchi cross here.  Krishnanagar is connected by F-12 Chandrauta-Krishnanagar to the east-west Mahendra Highway and Postal Highway.

Commerce
Krishnanagar is a wealthy, industrialized village with rice, oil and steel mills, sugar mill and many cement industries.
Highway connecting it with other places is an industrial road.

Culture
Krishnanagar is highly rich in culture, as different religions' people live here and because of the border area, both Indian and Nepalese people, Hindus, Muslims and Sikhs celebrates the festival of Hindu culture, Muslim culture and Sikh culture together.

References

Populated places in Kapilvastu District
Transit and customs posts along the India–Nepal border
Municipalities in Lumbini Province
Nepal municipalities established in 2014